Haplochromis melanopterus is a species of cichlid endemic to the Tanzanian portion of Lake Victoria where it occurs in Smith Sound.  This species can reach a length of  SL.

References

melanopterus
Fish of Tanzania
Fish of Lake Victoria
Fish described in 1928
Taxonomy articles created by Polbot